DCIA may refer to:

 Director of the Central Intelligence Agency
 Distributed Computing Industry Association
 Deep circumflex iliac artery